Bertrand Denis (1902–1986) was a French industrialist and politician.

1902 births
1986 deaths
People from Mayenne
Politicians from Pays de la Loire
National Centre of Independents and Peasants politicians
Independent Republicans politicians
Deputies of the 1st National Assembly of the French Fifth Republic
Deputies of the 2nd National Assembly of the French Fifth Republic
Deputies of the 3rd National Assembly of the French Fifth Republic
Deputies of the 4th National Assembly of the French Fifth Republic
Deputies of the 5th National Assembly of the French Fifth Republic
French industrialists
HEC Paris alumni
Chevaliers of the Légion d'honneur